Marc Baum (born June 11, 1978) is a Luxembourgish actor and politician.

He starred as Olif in the 2004 film Venezuela and Heinrich Heißsporn is the 2006 film Full Stuff. Since the 2018 general election in Luxembourg, Baum has sat in the Chamber of Deputies as one of the two déi Lénk Deputies.

References

1978 births
Living people
Luxembourgian male film actors
21st-century Luxembourgian male actors
Place of birth missing (living people)
The Left (Luxembourg) politicians
Members of the Chamber of Deputies (Luxembourg) from Sud